Josef Schejbal (8 December 1922 – April 1977) was a Czechoslovak rower. He competed at the 1948 Summer Olympics in London with the men's coxless four where they were eliminated in the round one repêchage.

References

External links
  

1922 births
1977 deaths 
Czechoslovak male rowers
Olympic rowers of Czechoslovakia
Rowers at the 1948 Summer Olympics
European Rowing Championships medalists